Copibryophila is a monotypic moth genus of the family Noctuidae. Its only species, Copibryophila angelica, is found in the US state of California. Both the genus and species were first described by John Bernhardt Smith in 1900.

References

Acontiinae
Monotypic moth genera